The cinema of Russia began in the Russian Empire, widely developed in the Soviet Union and in the years following its dissolution, the Russian film industry would remain internationally recognized. In the 21st century, Russian cinema has become known internationally with films such as Hardcore Henry (2015), Leviathan (2014), Night Watch (2004) and Brother (1997). The Moscow International Film Festival began in Moscow in 1935. The Nika Award is the main annual national film award in Russia.

Cinema of the Russian Empire

The first films seen in the Russian Empire were brought in by the Lumière brothers, who exhibited films in Moscow and St. Petersburg in May 1896. That same month, Lumière cameraman Camille Cerf made the first film in Russia, recording the coronation of Nicholas II at the Kremlin.

Aleksandr Drankov produced the first Russian narrative film Stenka Razin (1908), based on events told in a folk song and directed by Vladimir Romashkov. Among the notable Russian filmmakers of the era were Aleksandr Khanzhonkov and Ivan Mozzhukhin, who made Defence of Sevastopol in 1912. Yakov Protazanov made Departure of a Grand Old Man (1912), a biographical film about Lev Tolstoy.

Animation pioneer Ladislas Starevich made the first Russian animated film (and the first stop motion puppet film with a story) in 1910 – Lucanus Cervus. His other stop-motion shorts The Beautiful Leukanida (1912) and The Cameraman's Revenge (1912), produced for Aleksandr Khanzhonkov, are also among the first animated films. In the following years, Starevich made shorts based on fables such as The Grasshopper and the Ant (1913), as well as World War I propaganda films.

Olga Preobrazhenskaya was the first woman director of Russia. In 1916 she made her directorial debut Miss Peasant. However, the film has been lost. In the Soviet era she directed Women of Ryazan (1927).

During World War I, imports dropped drastically, and Russian filmmakers turned out anti-German, nationalistic films. In 1916, 499 films were made in Russia, more than three times the number of three years earlier.

Before the October Revolution, Russia did not have a highly developed film industry due to the general populace being too poor to support a native industry. The Russian Revolution brought more change, with a number of films with anti-Tsarist themes. The last significant film of the era, made in 1917, was Father Sergius by Yakov Protazanov and Alexandre Volkoff. It would become the first new film release of the Soviet era.

Cinema of the Soviet Union

Early Soviet cinema (1917–1953)

Vladimir Lenin was the first political leader of the twentieth century to recognize the importance of film. He saw film as a way to unite the nation over which the Bolsheviks, then a minority party of some 200,000 members, had assumed leadership.  His government gave top priority to the rapid development of the Soviet film industry, which was nationalized in August 1919 and put under the direct authority of Lenin's wife, Nadezhda Krupskaya.

One of the first acts of the Cinema Committee was to create a professional film school in Moscow to train directors, technicians, and actors for the cinema. The All Union State Institute of Cinematography was the first such school in the world. Lev Kuleshov, who taught at the school, formulated the groundbreaking editing process called montage, which he conceived of as an expressive process whereby dissimilar images could be linked together to create non-literal or symbolic meaning. His work has been referred to as the Kuleshov effect. Two of Kuleshov's most famous students were Sergey Eisenstein and Vsevolod Pudovkin.

Although Russian was the dominant language in films during the Soviet era, the cinema of the Soviet Union encompassed films of the Armenian SSR, Georgian SSR, Ukrainian SSR, and, to a lesser degree, Lithuanian SSR, Belorussian SSR, and Moldavian SSR.  For much of the Soviet Union's history, with notable exceptions in the 1920s and the late 1980s, film content was heavily circumscribed and subject to censorship and bureaucratic state control.

The development of the soviet film industry was innovative and linked with the Constructivist art movement. In 1922-3, Kino-Fot became the first Soviet cinema magazine and reflected the constructivist views of its editor, Aleksei Gan.

As with much Soviet art during the 1920s, films addressed major social and political events of the time.  An important film of this period was Sergei Eisenstein's The Battleship Potemkin, not only because of its depiction of events leading up to the 1905 Revolution, but also because of innovative cinematic techniques, such as the use of jump-cuts to achieve political ends. To this day, Battleship Potemkin is considered one of the greatest films of all time.

Vsevolod Pudovkin developed a new theory of montage based on cognitive linkage rather than dialectical collision. Pudovkin's Mother (1926) was internationally acclaimed for its montage, as well as for its emotional qualities. Later Pudovkin was publicly charged with formalism for his experimental sound film A Simple Case (1932), which he was forced to release without its sound track. 

Two other key filmmakers of the Soviet silent era were Aleksandr Dovzhenko and Dziga Vertov. Dovzhenko's best known work is his Ukraine Trilogy, and more specifically the film Earth (1930). Vertov is well-known for his film Man with a Movie Camera (1929) and the Kino-Eye theory - that the camera, like the human eye, is best used to explore real life, which had a huge impact on documentary filmmaking.

However, with the consolidation of Stalinist power in the Soviet Union, and the emergence of Socialist realism as state policy, which carried over from painting and sculpture into filmmaking, Soviet film became subject to almost total state control.

Films released in the 1930s include the popular musicals Jolly Fellows (1934), Circus (1936) and Volga-Volga (1938) directed by the longtime collaborator of Sergei Eisenstein, Grigori Aleksandrov. These films starred leading actress of the time Lyubov Orlova, who was also Aleksandrov's wife.

The New Gulliver (1935) by Aleksandr Ptushko is a landmark in stop-motion animation. 

In the 1930s and the 1940s Eisenstein directed two historical epics – Aleksandr Nevsky (1938) and Ivan the Terrible (1944). Both films were scored by composer Sergei Prokofiev.

Immediately after the end of the Second World War, the Soviet color films such as The Stone Flower (1947) by Aleksandr Ptushko, Ballad of Siberia (1947), and Cossacks of the Kuban (1949), both by director Ivan Pyryev, were released.

Soviet cinema went into rapid decline after the World War II: film production fell from 19 features in 1945 to 5 in 1952. The situation did not improve until the late 1950s when Soviet films achieved critical success partly as a result, similar to the cinema of other Eastern Bloc countries, for reflecting the tension between independent creativity and state-directed outcomes.

Late Soviet cinema (1953–1990)

In the late 1950s and early 1960s Soviet film-makers were given a less constricted environment, and while censorship remained, films emerged which began to be recognised outside the Soviet bloc such as Ballad of a Soldier by Grigory Chukhray which won the 1961 BAFTA Award for Best Film and the 1958 Palme d'Or winning The Cranes Are Flying by Mikhail Kalatozov. The Height (1957) by Aleksander Zarkhi is considered to be one of the best films of the 1950s (it also became the foundation of the Bard movement). Yet, some films did not receive a wide release; The Story of Asya Klyachina (1966) by Andrei Konchalovsky, Commissar (1967) by Aleksandr Askoldov,  Brief Encounters (1967) by Kira Muratova and Trial on the Road (1971) by Aleksei German.

The most critically acclaimed Russian director of the 1960s and 1970s was Andrei Tarkovsky, who directed the groundbreaking art-house films Ivan's Childhood, Andrei Rublev, Solaris, Mirror and Stalker. His films won awards at Cannes and Venice Film Festival. His debut film Ivan's Childhood won the Golden Lion award at the Venice Film Festival in 1962. Tarkovsky's film Andrei Rublev (1966) won the FIPRESCI prize at the 1969 Cannes Festival. For Stalker (1979), Tarkovsky won the Ecumenical Jury Prize in Cannes in 1980. He also won the Special Grand Prize for Solaris in 1972 and for Sacrifice at Cannes in 1986.

Other notable Soviet directors include Sergei Bondarchuk, Sergey Paradzhanov, Larisa Shepitko, Kira Muratova, Marlen Khutsiev, Mikhail Kalatozov, Nikita Mikhalkov, Vladimir Menshov and Gleb Panfilov.

The Seventh Companion (1967) marked the debut of film director Aleksei German. Due to Soviet censorship, his film Trial on the Road (1971) was shelved for 15 years. His son Aleksei is also a director.

Sergei Bondarchuk initially came to prominence as an actor. His directorial debut was Fate of a Man which was released in 1959. Bondarchuk is best known for directing and starring in the Academy Award winning adaptation War and Peace (1967). His son Fyodor Bondarchuk is also a film director and producer.

Among other critically acclaimed literary adaptations from the 1960s was Grigory Kozintsev's Hamlet (1964), winner of the Special Jury Prize at the Venice Film Festival.

Russian actor Nikita Mikhalkov had his feature directorial debut in 1974 with At Home Among Strangers. His brother, Andrey Konchalovsky, is also an award winning director. Konchalovsky had his directorial debut with The First Teacher in 1965, which won an award at the Venice Film Festival (Best Actress - Natalya Arinbasarova).

Film director Kira Muratova faced censorship during the Soviet era and only started to receive public recognition and first awards during Perestroyka. Her film Among Grey Stones (1983) was screened in the Un Certain Regard section at the 1988 Cannes Film Festival.

Comedy genre was always the most popular one in Russia and the Soviet union with the highest number of box-office successes. Most popular Soviet comedies of the era were directed by Leonid Gaidai, Eldar Ryazanov and Georgiy Daneliya, such as Carnival Night (1956), The Irony of Fate (1976), Kidnapping, Caucasian Style (1967), Operation Y and Shurik's Other Adventures (1965), The Twelve Chairs (1976), Walking the Streets of Moscow (1964), Gentlemen of Fortune (1971).

Soviet filmmakers also produced historical adventure films, such as D'Artagnan and Three Musketeers (1978) and Gardes-Marines, Ahead! (1988). Among those, "osterns", the Soviet take on the westerns, became also popular. Examples of the Ostern include White Sun of the Desert (1970), The Headless Horseman (1972), Armed and Dangerous (1977), A Man from the Boulevard des Capucines (1987). On TV, mystery and spy miniseries were prevalent, such as Seventeen Moments of Spring, The Meeting Place Cannot Be Changed, Investigation Held by ZnaToKi and a faithful adaptation of Sherlock Holmes stories starring Vasily Livanov as Holmes.

A respective amount of World War II dramas made in the 1970s and the 1980s were acclaimed internationally, some of which are Liberation (1971) by Yuri Ozerov, The Dawns Here Are Quiet (1972) by Stanislav Rostotsky, They Fought for Their Country (1975) by Sergei Bondarchuk, The Ascent (1977) by Larisa Shepitko and Come and See (1985) by Elem Klimov.

Co-production between Soviet Union and Japan, Dersu Uzala, adapted from Vladimir Arsenyev's book, directed by Akira Kurosawa and starring  Maxim Munzuk and Yuri Solomin, won the Academy Award for Best Foreign Picture in 1976. The film was a box-office success and ended up reviving Kurosawa's career.

Yuri Norstein is perhaps the most famous Russian animator of the Soviet period; his animated shorts Hedgehog in the Fog and Tale of Tales gained worldwide recognition and have served as inspiration for many filmmakers.

Larisa Shepitko's film The Ascent was the first Soviet movie to win the Golden Bear at the Berlin Film Festival in 1977.

Romantic drama Moscow Does Not Believe in Tears by Vladimir Menshov won the Best Foreign Picture award at the 1981 Academy Awards and it was very popular at the Soviet box-office with over 93 million viewers.

Come and See by Elem Klimov received the FIPRESCI prize at the 1985 Moscow Film Festival.

Science fiction film Dead Man's Letters (1986), directorial debut of Konstantin Lopushansky, was screened at the International Critics' Week section of the Cannes Film Festival in 1987
and received the FIPRESCI prize at the 35th International Filmfestival Mannheim-Heidelberg. His follow-up film A Visitor to a Museum (1989) was entered into the Moscow Film Festival where it won the Silver St. George and the Prix of Ecumenical Jury.

In the 1980s Russian director Andrei Konchalovsky was the first filmmaker to find success in Hollywood. In America he directed Maria's Lovers (1984), Runaway Train (1985) and Tango & Cash (1989).

With the onset of Perestroika and Glasnost in the mid-1980s, Soviet films emerged which began to address formerly censored topics, such as drug addiction, The Needle (1988) by Rashid Nugmanov, which starred rock singer Viktor Tsoi, and sexuality and alienation in Soviet society, Little Vera (1988) by Vasili Pichul. However, the industry suffered from drastically reduced state subsidies and the state-controlled film distribution system also collapsed, leading to the dominance of western films in Russia's theatres.

Several Soviet films have received Oscars; War and Peace, Dersu Uzala, Moscow Does Not Believe in Tears.

New Russian cinema

1990s 

In the 1990s there were much fewer films being made as the cinema industry was experiencing big changes and the economy was uncertain. From 300 in 1990 the number fell to 213 in 1991, 172 in 1992, 152 in 1993, to 68 in 1994, 46 in 1995 and 28 in 1996.

In 1990 censorship was abolished on an official level: the state could no longer interfere in the production and distribution of films, except in cases of war propaganda, disclosure of state secrets, and pornography. As part of the abolition of all central Soviet administrative units, the Cinema Committee of the USSR was dissolved in 1991.

Russian cinema of the 90s acquired new features and themes, with the Chechen war also affecting filmmakers. Many films of that time dealt with war and Stalinism.

Kinotavr was first held in 1990 in Podolsk, and then in 1991 in Sochi, where it has been held ever since. The Nika Award, which is distributed by the Russian Film Academy, was founded in 1998.

In 1990 Pavel Lungin won the Best Director award for Taxi Blues, which starred rock musician Pyotr Mamonov in the lead role, at the Cannes Film Festival.

Nikita Mikhalkov won the Golden Lion at the Venice Film Festival for Close to Eden in 1991.

The Chekist directed by Aleksandr Rogozhkin was a drama set in the period of Red Terror and told the story of a Cheka leader who gradually becomes unhinged. It was screened in the Un Certain Regard section at the 1992 Cannes Film Festival.

The drama Burnt by the Sun (1994) by Nikita Mikhalkov is set in a small countryside community in the time when Stalinism starts to disrupt their idyllic retreat and alter their characters and fates. The film received an Oscar for Best Foreign Language Film and the Grand Prix du Jury at the 1994 Cannes Film Festival.

In the context of the Russian World War II history Pavel Chukhrai filmed The Thief (1997), a movie about a mother who becomes romantically involved with a criminal who impersonates an officer. The film was awarded with 6 national prizes Nika, got a special prize in Venice and became the Oscar nominee.

One of the first commercially successful post-Soviet films was the crime drama Brother directed by Aleksei Balabanov. It was screened as part of the Un Certain Regard section at the 1997 Cannes Film Festival. He also directed the sequel Brother 2 in 2000.

Valery Todorovsky's The Country of the Deaf (1998), a comedy film based on the screenplay by Renata Litvinova parodied Russia of the 90s. It described the journey of two female friends caught in the fight of two clans – the deaf and the hearing. It was entered in the 48th Berlin International Film Festival.

In 1997 Aleksandr Sokurov had his international breakthrough with the arthouse drama Mother and Son. It won the Special Silver St. George at the 20th Moscow International Film Festival in 1997.

1998 film Khrustalyov, My Car! directed by Aleksei German described the last days of Stalinist Russia. It was entered in the 1998 Cannes Film Festival.

Nikita Milhalkov's international co-production The Barber of Siberia was screened at the 1998 Cannes Film Festival. The film featured English and Russian actors. It was the first post-Soviet big budget feature film; the film cost 35 million dollars.

Internationally co-produced film East/West (1999) starring Sandrine Bonnaire and Catherine Deneuve told the story of an emigre family living in Stalinist USSR. The film was nominated as Best Foreign Film at the Academy Awards, Golden Globes, National Board of Review, and received four nominations at the César Awards.

The satiric melodrama of Dmitry Meskhiev, Women's Property (1999) describes a love affair between a young student and an older actress who is incurably ill. Her death leads the protagonist to face bitter loneliness. The film starred Yelena Safonova and featured actor Konstantin Khabensky in an early lead role.

Cult crime comedy 8 ½ $ (1999), directorial debut of Grigori Konstantinopolsky, starring Ivan Okhlobystin and Fyodor Bondarchuk was a satiric take on 1990s Russia. It told the story of a television advertisement director who becomes romantically involved with a gangster's girlfriend.

Svetlana Baskova directed the low-budget independently made exploitation shock-horror film The Green Elephant in 1999. Baskova noted that the film was conceived as a protest against the Chechen war. In 2022 the film has been banned in Russia.

2000s 

The film His Wife's Diary (2000) by Aleksei Uchitel won awards at both Kinotavr and Nika. The biographical film was about the last love affair of writer Ivan Bunin. Uchitel's 2005 film Dreaming of Space won the Golden George at the Moscow Film Festival.

Roman Kachanov directed the absurdist comedies Demobbed (2000) and Down House (2001), which were both co-written with actor Ivan Okhlobystin who also starred in the films. Both are considered to be cult films in Russia. FIPRESCI awarded a special mention to the film Demobbed at the 2000 Kinotavr.

The Cuckoo by Aleksandr Rogozhkin won multiple awards at the Moscow Film Festival in 2002. The WWII set film starred Finnish actor Ville Haapasalo as a stranded Finnish sniper.

Egor Konchalovsky directed Antikiller (2002) starring Gosha Kutsenko as a police officer turned vigilante proved to be a success among Russian audiences.

In 2002 Pavel Lungin directed the film Tycoon about a Russian oligarch. Vladimir Mashkov played the Boris Berezovsky inspired lead character.

2002 comedy-drama film In Motion was the directorial debut of Filipp Yankovsky.

Feature film debut by Aleksei German Jr. The Last Train (2003) won the Best Picture and International Film Critics' Awards at Thessaloniki. For his film Paper Soldier, Aleksei German Jr. received the Silver Lion Award from the Venice Film Festival in 2008.

Andrey Zvyagintsev's The Return (2003), a Golden Lion award recipient, shows two brothers' test of life when their father suddenly returns that reaches a deep almost-mystic pitch. The Russian Ark (2003) by Alexander Sokurov, was filmed in a single 96-minute shot in the Russian Hermitage Museum is a dream-like narration that tells about classic Russian culture sailing in the Ark. It was screened at the Cannes Film Festival.

Night Watch (2004) by Timur Bekmambetov was one of the first blockbusters made after the collapse of the Soviet film industry. The supernatural thriller starred Konstantin Khabensky and was based on the eponymous book by Sergei Lukyanenko. It was followed by the sequel Day Watch (2006).

Russian actress Renata Litvinova debuted as director in 2004 with the film Goddess: How I fell in Love.

The serialised novels by Boris Akunin set in pre-Revolutionary Russia evolve around fictional Erast Fandorin adventures in three popular movies: The Azazel (2002) by Aleksandr Adabashyan, The Turkish Gambit (2005) by Dzhanik Fayziev and The State Counsellor (2005) by Filipp Yankovsky.

Life of the Orthodox Monastery and their Christian miracles are described in the film The Island (2006) by Pavel Lungin. The film was screened out of the competition at the 63rd Venice International Film Festival and received the Golden Eagle and Nika awards.

Konstantin Lopushansky directed the science-fiction film The Ugly Swans in 2006, based on the 1967 novel by Arkady and Boris Strugatsky. The film received the Best Score award at Kinotavr.

One of Russia's all-time biggest box-office hits was Timur Bekmambetov's romantic-comedy The Irony of Fate 2, directed in 2007 as a sequel to the 1976 film. 2008 musical film Stilyagi, Hipsters directed by Valery Todorovsky about the youth lifestyle in the 1950s Soviet Union was a success at the box office. It received the Golden Eagle and Nika awards for best picture.

Valeriya Gai Germanika received the "Special Mention" of the jury of the Camera d'Or competition at the 2008 Cannes Film Festival for her feature debut Everybody Dies but Me.

At the 2008 Sundance Film Festival Anna Melikian won the award for best Dramatic Directing for her film Mermaid.

Sci-fi picture Dark Planet (2008-2009) based on the book by Arkady and Boris Strugatsky, directed by Fyodor Bondarchuk, was one of the most expensive Russian films of the 2000s, with its budget of $36.6 million.

2010s 

In 2014 censorship of cinematic works was officially introduced with a new and stricter revision of the "screening certificate" act, without which public film screenings are not allowed and are punishable by law. Curse words in films were banned. The concept of a "screening certificate" first appeared in Russian laws in 1993, when Viktor Chernomyrdin signed the decree "On the registration of films and videos", the main purpose of which was to combat the spread of pirated content.  For a decade and a half, the document was more or less a formality.

In 2010 the comedy anthology film Yolki produced by Timur Bekmambetov was released. It spawned five sequels and one spin-off. How I Ended This Summer by Alexei Popogrebski, a film shot in remote Chukotka, won Berlin's Film Festival Golden Bear in 2010. The same year arthouse film Silent Souls by Aleksey Fedorchenko won the Golden Osella at the Venice Film Festival for best cinematography.

Yury Bykov debuted as a director with the film To Live in 2010. His film The Major screened at the 2013 Cannes Film Festival. His film The Fool won the Best Actor award at the 2014 Locarno Film Festival.

Faust by Aleksandr Sokurov won the Golden Lion at the 2011 Venice Film Festival. His follow-up film Francofonia received the Mimmo Rotella Award at the 2015 Venice Film Festival.

2011 romantic comedy Lucky Trouble directed by Levan Gabriadze and produced by Timur Bekmambetov, starred Hollywood actress Milla Jovovich who played the female lead opposite Konstantin Khabensky.

Generation Pi (2011) by Victor Ginzburg was an independently produced satiric comedy about advertisement business set in the 1990s. The film was based on Victor Pelevin's 1999 novel of the same name.

Aleksey Adrianov directed the high-budget Boris Akunin adaptation Spy in 2012.

A Russian filmmaker who continued to make a name for himself in Hollywood was Timur Bekmambetov, a producer and director of blockbuster films. In the United States he directed Wanted (2008), Abraham Lincoln: Vampire Hunter (2012) and Ben-Hur (2016).

Starting from 2003 Russia's animation industry began to manufacture films which are profitable domestically and abroad. Some of the pictures are The Snow Queen 1, 2, 3, Masha and the Bear, Kikoriki, Dobrynya Nikitich and Zmey Gorynych.

War epic Stalingrad directed by Fyodor Bondarchuk in 2013 set new box-office records in Russia and abroad. After Stalingrad's success at the box-office, increasingly more films started to be made in Russia about WWII. Other WWII films that were made in Russia included The Dawns Here Are Quiet (2015), Panfilov's 28 Men (2016), Sobibor (2018), T-34 (2019), The Last Frontier (2020), V2. Escape from Hell (2021) and The Red Ghost (2021).

2013 comedy Kiss Them All!  by Zhora Kryzhovnikov, produced by Timur Bekmambetov, is the most profitable domestic film in the history of Russian box office, having managed to earn more than 27.3 million dollars on a comparatively modest budget of $1.5 million.

Film by Alexander Veledinsky, The Geographer Drank His Globe Away, based on the novel of the same name by Alexei Ivanov, was awarded the main prize at Kinotavr 2013.

In 2014, Andrey Zvyagintsev's Leviathan was entered in the 2014 Cannes Film Festival and nominated for best foreign picture at the 87th Academy Awards. It won the Golden Globe for best foreign language film. After the film got leaked online and was downloaded by 1.5 million users, domestic distributors decided to make a wide release of the controversial film which was negatively viewed by the Russian authorities due to its gloomy and critical view of Russia.

Under Electric Clouds by Aleksei German won the Silver Bear for Outstanding Artistic Contribution for Cinematography at the 2015 Berlin Film Festival. His follow-up film Dovlatov (2018) about writer Sergei Dovlatov, was awarded a Silver Bear for Outstanding Artistic Contribution for costume and production design.

In 2015 Ilya Naishuller debuted with the film Hardcore Henry which was screened at the Toronto Film Festival. He later directed Nobody (2021) in Hollywood.

Andrei Konchalovsky received the Silver Lion for best director at the 73rd Venice International Film Festival for his black and white Holocaust drama Paradise in 2016. He previously received the Silver Lion for The Postman's White Nights in 2014.

2016 one-man thriller film Collector by Aleksei Krasovsky starring Konstantin Khabensky won an award at the Karlovy Vary Festival.

Disaster film Flight Crew, directed by Nikolai Lebedev with actor Danila Kozlovsky was a success at the box-office in 2016.

The Student by Kirill Serebrennikov won the François Chalais Prize at the 2016 Cannes Film Festival.

2016 film Zoology by Ivan Tverdovsky won the Special Jury Award at the Karlovy Vary Film Festival.

The 2017 sports drama Going Vertical by Anton Megerdichev is the highest grossing domestic film of the 2010s. It also became the highest-grossing Russian film in China, where it grossed  which brought the film's worldwide gross to $66.3 million.

Walt Disney produced Slavic fantasy film Last Knight directed by Dmitry Dyachenko was a success at the box-office in 2017, earning $30 million. The film was followed by two sequels in 2021; The Last Warrior: Root of Evil and The Last Warrior: A Messenger of Darkness.

Arrhythmia by director Boris Khlebnikov received the Best Actor award at the 2017 Karlovy Vary Film Festival.

Matilda by Aleksei Uchitel about the relationship between ballerina Matilda Kshesinskaya and Nicholas II caused controversy amongst monarchist and Orthodox authorities and public in 2017.

Maryus Vaysberg is a film director mainly working in the comedy genre. He is one of the most commercially successful directors of Russia. His 2017 film Naughty Grandma was a box office success and the most successful Russian film in 2017. Many of his films starred future president of the Ukraine Volodymyr Zelenskyy.

Anna's War by  Aleksey Fedorchenko  premiered at the Rotterdam Film Festival in 2018. The film won the Golden Eagle Award in the Best Film category. Fedorchenko won the award for Best Director.

2019 comedy film Serf directed by Klim Shipenko and starring Miloš Biković set new domestic box-office records. It grossed $42.4 million against a budget of $2.6 million. The same year Shipenko directed the psychological thriller Text starring Alexander Petrov, which was also a success at the box-office and received a Nika and multiple Golden Eagle awards.

In the following years many Russian films have gotten wide releases in China, and there has been an increased number of planned Russo-Chinese co-productions. A few of the films produced by Russia and China are Viy, Viy 2: Journey to China starring Jackie Chan and Arnold Schwarzenegger, The Snow Queen 3: Fire and Ice and Quackerz.

2020s
Dau, the first film of the controversial DAU project by director Ilya Khrzhanovsky, which was initially conceived as a biopic of Soviet scientist Lev Landau, premiered in 2019 in Paris. DAU. Natasha premiered at the 2020 Berlin Film Festival where it won the Silver Bear for an Outstanding Artistic Contribution. The rest of the films were released on VOD through the official DAU website in 2020.

War drama Persian Lessons by Vadim Perelman premiered at the 2020 Berlin Film Festival.

At the 2020 Venice Film Festival, Dear Comrades! directed by Andrei Konchalovsky telling the story of the Novocherkassk massacre, won the Special Jury Prize.

Historic romance film The Silver Skates, by Michael Lockshin in his directorial debut, was released in 2020.

Yakut language drama Scarecrow by Dmitry Davydov won the main prize at the 2020 Kinotavr film festival. Yakut films, also nicknamed "Sakhawood", have been steadily gaining popularity in Russia.

House Arrest by Aleksey German Jr. premiered at the 2021 Cannes Film Festival.

The Last Darling Bulgaria by Aleksey Fedorchenko premiered at the 2021 Moscow Film Festival.

Historical war drama film Ivan Denisovich by veteran director Gleb Panfilov premiered at the 2021 Locarno Film Festival. The film based on the novel by Aleksandr Solzhenitsyn starred Filipp Yankovsky in the main role.

In 2021 WWII action film The Red Ghost by Andrei Bogatyrev was released in Russian cinemas.

2021 film Gerda about a young striptease dancer by director Natalya Kudryashova premiered at the Locarno Film Festival where it received the Best Actress award and the special prize from the youth jury of the festival.

Natalya Merkulova and Aleksey Chupov's film Captain Volkonogov Escaped (2021), set during the Great Purge, was screened at the Venice International Film Festival.

Surrealistic satire Petrov's Flu by Kirill Serebrennikov and Ossetian language drama Unclenching the Fists by Kira Kovalenko were screened at the 2021 Cannes Film Festival. Finnish-Russian co-production Compartment No. 6 by Juho Kuosmanen was also part of the program and it won the Grand Prix of the festival.

Apocalyptic drama Quarantine by Diana Ringo, co-produced by Finland and Russia, was an official non-English language Golden Globes 2022 entry.

Tchaikovsky's Wife by Kirill Serebrennikov was included in the competition program of 2022 Cannes Film Festival.

Convenience Store by Mikhail Borodin, about Uzbeki immigrants working illegally in Moscow, premiered at the 2022 Berlin Film Festival.

2022 boycott
The 2022 Russian invasion of Ukraine has impacted Russian cinema.  The Russian Association of Theater Owners said that there is a "high probability of the liquidation of the entire film screening industry"; ticket sales in March 2022 were half of what they had been in March 2021. The Annecy International Animation Film Festival, Berlinale, Cannes, Venice, and the Toronto Film Festival banned official Russian delegations. The Stockholm Film Festival banned all Russian projects funded by the government. The European Film Awards and Emmys banned Russian films outright. FIAPF (Fédération Internationale des Associations de Producteurs de Films, translated as the International Federation of Film Producers Associations) paused the accreditation of the Moscow International Film Festival and Message to Man until further notice. MIPTV in France won't allow "any Russian film and TV outfits" in 2022, and Russia has also been banned from the Banff World Media Festival and NATPE. Several major international film distributors, including The Walt Disney Company, Sony Pictures, Paramount, and Warner Bros stopped screening films in Russia; prior to the invasion, movies produced in the United States made up 70% of the Russian film market. FIPRESCI announced that it will not participate in festivals and other events organized by the Russian government and its offices, and canceled a colloquium in St. Petersburg, that was to make it familiar with new Russian films.

Ukrainian film director Sergei Loznitsa spoke out against banning Russian films. He said: "Among Russian filmmakers, there are people who have condemned the war, who oppose the regime and openly expressed their condemnation. And in a way they're victims of this whole conflict like the rest of us." And: "We must not judge people based on their passports. We can judge them on their acts." Dissident Russian film director Kirill Serebrennikov also spoke out against the boycott.

Russian film production 
There are around 400 private production companies. They do not have their own facilities for creating films, and therefore must rent out spaces and equipment from their qualified partners. There are 35 film studios (9 of them are governmental) that are the major service for renting space. The studios have 107 shooting pavilions. There are 23 private companies on the Russian market that rent their equipment of all kinds to the production teams.

Leading production companies on the market 
The list is composed by the Cinema Foundation of Russia. It allows companies get governmental financial support. In 2017 the number of market leaders was increased up to 10 companies.
 Bazelevs Company run by Timur Bekmambetov 
 Art Pictures Studio run by Fyodor Bondarchuk and Dmitri Rudovsky
 СТВ run by Sergey Selyanov 
 Trite run by Nikita Mikhalkov
 Enjoy Movies run by Andreasyan brothers and Georgy Malkov
 Non-Stop Production run by Alexander Rodnyansky, Sergey Melkumov 
 Central Partnership part of Gazprom holding
 Film Direction run by Anatoly Maksimov
 Profit run by Igor Tolstunov
 VBD Group

List of highest-grossing films 

According to Kinopoisk.ru, highest-grossing Russian films, as of early 2020, are the following: List of highest-grossing Russian films

Note: This list does not include earlier Soviet films, which are listed separately on the list of highest-grossing films in the Soviet Union.

Film distribution 
There are 600 companies that release films all around Russia that includes 105 chain cinema theatres and 495 independent theatres. Chain companies consist of 29 federal, 19 regional and 57 local theatres. According to Neva Research, as of 1 July 2016 there were 1,227 cinemas with 4,067 screens in Russia. Ten major cinema companies hold 346 theatres with 1,772 screens, which corresponds to 43.6% of the whole amount.

In 2015 all the cinemas were finally digitalized. In the beginning of 2016 Russia has 33 theatres with 4D technology, 80 theatres with premium sound system, 43 theatres with 3D IMAX effect.

Awards 
 Nika Award
 Golden Eagle Award
 Russian Guild of Film Critics
 TEFI

Festivals 
There are many film festivals in Russia. They include:

Artdocfest (Moscow and other cities)
Ekaterinburg Jewish Film Festival (Ekaterinburg)
Faces of Love Film Festival (Sochi)
Festival of Festivals, St. Petersburg
Kazan International Festival of Muslim Cinema (Kazan)
Kinoshock (in Anapa)
 Kinotavr (Sochi)
KROK International Animated Films Festival (in cities along the Volga or Dnieper rivers)
Message to Man International Film Festival (St Petersburg)
 Moscow International Film Festival
Moscow Jewish Film Festival
Open Russian Festival of Animated Film (Suzdal)
 Pacific Meridian (in Vladivostok)
 Saint Petersburg International Film Festival
Side by Side Lesbian and Gay International Film Festival (St Petersburg)
Sozvezdie (various locations)
Stalker International Film Festival on Human Rights (Moscow and regional cities)

VOD platforms 
Notable Video on Demand platforms include Okko, Start, Kinopoisk HD, Premier, Ivi.ru, KION.

However online content platforms also face censorship in Russia.

Cinematography schools
 Gerasimov Institute of Cinematography (claimed to be the oldest film school in the world)
 New York Film Academy, Moscow campus
 Moscow International Film School
Russian State Institute of Performing Arts, formerly Leningrad State Institute of Theatre, Music, and Cinema (LGITMiK)

See also 
 Nika Award – the main national film award in Russia
 Cinema of the world
 History of Russian animation
 List of Russian films
 Union of Cinematographers of the Russian Federation

References

External links
Russian film titles  at the Internet Movie Database
Russian Film Hub